Tymovirus is a genus of viruses in the order Tymovirales, in the family Tymoviridae. Plants serve as natural hosts. There are 28 species in this genus.

Taxonomy
The genus contains the following species:

 Anagyris vein yellowing virus
 Andean potato latent virus
 Andean potato mild mosaic virus
 Belladonna mottle virus
 Cacao yellow mosaic virus
 Calopogonium yellow vein virus
 Chayote mosaic virus
 Chiltepin yellow mosaic virus
 Clitoria yellow vein virus
 Desmodium yellow mottle virus
 Dulcamara mottle virus
 Eggplant mosaic virus
 Erysimum latent virus
 Kennedya yellow mosaic virus
 Melon rugose mosaic virus
 Nemesia ring necrosis virus
 Okra mosaic virus
 Ononis yellow mosaic virus
 Passion fruit yellow mosaic virus
 Peanut yellow mosaic virus
 Petunia vein banding virus
 Physalis mottle virus
 Plantago mottle virus
 Scrophularia mottle virus
 Tomato blistering mosaic tymovirus
 Turnip yellow mosaic virus
 Voandzeia necrotic mosaic virus
 Wild cucumber mosaic virus

Structure
Viruses in Tymovirus are non-enveloped, with icosahedral and isometric geometries, and T=3 symmetry. The diameter is around 30 nm. Genomes are linear, around 6.3kb in length.

Life cycle
Viral replication is cytoplasmic and lysogenic. Entry into the host cell is achieved by penetration into the host cell. Replication follows the positive stranded RNA virus replication model. Positive stranded RNA virus transcription is the method of transcription. Translation takes place by leaky scanning. The virus exits the host cell by monopartite non-tubule guided viral movement. Plants serve as the natural host. The virus is transmitted via a vector (insects). Transmission routes are vector and mechanical.

References

External links
 Viralzone: Tymovirus
 ICTV

Tymoviridae
Virus genera